Chromogranin A or parathyroid secretory protein 1 (gene name CHGA) is a member of the granin family of neuroendocrine secretory proteins. As such, it is located in secretory vesicles of neurons and endocrine cells such as islet beta cell secretory granules in the pancreas.  In humans, chromogranin A protein is encoded by the CHGA gene.

Tissue distribution 
Examples of cells producing chromogranin A (ChgA) are chromaffin cells of the adrenal medulla, paraganglia, enterochromaffin-like cells and beta cells of the pancreas. It is present in islet beta cell secretory granules. chromogranin-A (CgA)+ Pulmonary neuroendocrine cells account for 0.41% of all epithelial cells in the conducting airway, but are absent from the alveoli.

Function 
Chromogranin A is the precursor to several functional peptides including vasostatin-1, vasostatin-2, pancreastatin, catestatin and parastatin. These peptides negatively modulate the neuroendocrine function of the releasing cell (autocrine) or nearby cells (paracrine).

Chromogranin A induces and promotes the generation of secretory granules such as those containing insulin in pancreatic islet beta cells.

Clinical significance 

Chromogranin A is elevated in pheochromocytomas. It has been identified as autoantigen in type 1 diabetes. A peptide fragment of ChgA located in the Vasostatin-1, namely ChgA29-42 has been identified as the antigenic epitope recognized by diabetogenic BDC2.5 T cells from type 1 diabetes prone NOD mice.

It is used as an indicator for pancreas and prostate cancer and in carcinoid syndrome. It might play a role in early neoplasic progression.  Chromogranin A is cleaved by an endogenous prohormone convertase to produce several peptide fragments. See chromogranin A GeneRIFs for references. In immunohistochemistry it can be used to identify a range of neuroendocrine tumours and is highly specific for both benign and malignant cells of this type.

Mass spec data shows that several peptides originating from CHGA (163-194; 194–214; 272–295;) are significantly lower in samples from ulcerative colitis patients compared to control biopsies.

There are considerable differences in the amino acid composition between different species' chromogranin A . Commercial assays for measuring human CGA can usually not be used for measuring CGA in samples from other animals. Some specific parts of the molecule have a higher degree of amino acid homology and methods where the antibodies are directed against specific epitopes can be used to measure samples from different animals. Region-specific assays measuring defined parts of CGA, CGB and SG2 can be used for measurements in samples from cats and dogs. In dogs, the catestatin concentration showed weak negative associations with left atrial and ventricular sizes and the catestatin concentration showed weak positive associations with blood pressure.

Variants 
Variants exist for pancreastatin in various populations of the world. The variant Glycine297Serine has been shown to be more potent in inhibiting insulin-induced glucose uptake, resulting in higher risk of insulin resistance and diabetes among carriers of this variant. A team of researchers led by the Indian Institute of Technology Madras has found that the Glycine297Serine variation was present in approximately 15 percent of Indian and other South Asian populations.

References

Further reading

External links 
 chromogranin A antibody stains via Google Image 
 
 

Proteins